Boris Lubenov (sometimes listed as Boris Lyubenov, born April 20, 1947) is a Bulgarian sprint canoer who competed from the late 1960s to the early 1970s. He won a bronze medal in the C-2 1000 m event at the 1970 ICF Canoe Sprint World Championships in Copenhagen.

Lubenov also competed in two Summer Olympics, earning his best finish of fifth in the C-1 1000 m event at Mexico City in 1968.

References

Sports-reference.com profile

1947 births
Bulgarian male canoeists
Canoeists at the 1968 Summer Olympics
Canoeists at the 1972 Summer Olympics
Living people
Olympic canoeists of Bulgaria
ICF Canoe Sprint World Championships medalists in Canadian